Zona Industriale (in Italian literary Industrial Zone, referring to the industrial park), is a quarter of Naples, Italy. With Poggioreale, San Lorenzo, and Vicaria it forms the Fourth Municipality of the city.

Geography
Situated in the southeastern area of the city, close to the coast, Zona Industriale borders with the quarters of Porto, Mercato, San Lorenzo, Vicaria, Poggioreale, Barra and San Giovanni a Teduccio. It covers an area of 2.68 km2 and its population is of 6,082. Most of the area is covered by factories.

External links
 Fourth Municipality page on Naples website

Quartieri of Naples